The FC Istiklol 2016 season is Istiklol's eighth Tajik League season. They are the current defending Champions in the Tajik League, Tajik Cup and Tajik Supercup having completed a Domestic Treble during the 2015 season. They will also participate in the AFC Cup for the second time, entering at the group stage.

Season events
On 10 July 2016, Istiklol fired their entire coaching staff, including manager Mubin Ergashev, appointing Serbian Nikola Lazarevic as his replacement on 13 July 2016. On 31 October 2016, days after winning their fifth Tajik League title, Istiklol appointed Mukhsin Mukhamadiev as their new manager for the 2017 season.

Squad

Out on loan

Transfers

Winter

In:

Out:

Summer

In:

Out:

Friendlies

TFF Cup

Preliminary round

Group stage

Competitions

Tajik Supercup

Tajik League

Results summary

Results by round

Results

League table

Tajik Cup

Final

AFC Cup

Group stage

Squad statistics

Appearances and goals

|-
|colspan="14"|Players away from Istiklol on loan:
|-
|colspan="14"|Players who left Istiklol during the season:

|}

Goal scorers

Disciplinary record

Notes

References

External links 
 FC Istiklol Official Web Site

FC Istiklol seasons
Istiklol